İlham Kərimov (born 2 July 1976) is an Azerbaijani boxer. He competed in the men's light heavyweight event at the 1996 Summer Olympics.

References

1976 births
Living people
Azerbaijani male boxers
Olympic boxers of Azerbaijan
Boxers at the 1996 Summer Olympics
Place of birth missing (living people)
Light-heavyweight boxers
20th-century Azerbaijani people